John Young (fl. 1586–1597) was an English politician.

He was a Member (MP) of the Parliament of England for New Shoreham in 1586, 1589 and 1597.

References

Year of birth missing
Year of death missing
English MPs 1586–1587
English MPs 1589
English MPs 1597–1598
16th-century births